Gözeli can refer to:

 Gözeli, Emirdağ
 Gözeli, Sivrice